The 1925 Pottsville Maroons season was their inaugural season in the National Football League. The team finished a 10–2 league record and a 13–2 overall record. The team initially won the 1925 NFL championship, however a controversial suspension cost them the title, forcing the team to finish in second place.

Schedule

 Games in italics are against non-NFL teams.

Standings

References

1925
Pottsville Maroons
Boston